Guan Zhaoye (4 October 1929 – 26 December 2022) was a Chinese architect who was a professor at Tsinghua University, and an academician of the Chinese Academy of Engineering.

Biography
Guan was born in Beijing, on 4 October 1929, while his ancestral home is in Nanhai, Guangdong. His father  was a poet, scholar and industrialist. His elder male cousin Guan Zhaozhi was a mathematician and member of the Chinese Academy of Sciences. He attended Beijing Yuying High School, a school run by the American Church. In 1947, he entered Yenching University, but transferred to Tsinghua University a year later.

After graduating in 1952, Guan stayed and taught at Tsinghua University, where he was promoted to associate professor in 1978 and to full professor in 1984. From 1981 to 1982, he was a visiting scholar at Massachusetts Institute of Technology.

On 26 December 2022, he died at Beijing Changgeng Hospital, at the age of 93.

Buildings designed by Guan
 Dongsi Shitiao station of Beijing Metro
 Tsinghua University Library
 Buildings of School of Science, Tsinghua University
 Building of Medical School of Tsinghua University
 Peking University Library
 Xuzhou Museum
 Second Teaching Building of Hainan University
 Xi'an Eurasian University Library
 Decorative reliefs on the Monument to the People's Heroes

Honours and awards
 1995 Member of the Chinese Academy of Engineering (CAE)
 2000 Liang Sicheng Architecture Prize
 2005 World Chinese Architects Association Architectural Design Award

References

1929 births
2022 deaths
Engineers from Beijing
20th-century Chinese architects
Yenching University alumni
Tsinghua University alumni
Academic staff of Tsinghua University
Members of the Chinese Academy of Engineering
21st-century Chinese architects